General elections were held in Uganda on 25 April 1962 in preparation for independence on 9 October. However, elections were not held in all parts of the country, with the Parliament of Buganda nominating 21 members (all of whom belonged to the Kabaka Yekka party) to the national parliament instead. The result was a victory for the Uganda People's Congress, which won 37 of the 82 seats, and went on to form an alliance with Kabaka Yekka.

Results

References

Uganda
1962 in Uganda
Elections in Uganda
Uganda Protectorate
Election and referendum articles with incomplete results
April 1962 events in Africa